Bhargava Law College is a private law school in Samba in Samba district in the Indian union territory of Jammu and Kashmir. It offers three-year undergraduate law courses and five-year integrated LL.B. courses, approved by the Bar Council of India in New Delhi and affiliated to the University of Jammu.

History
The college was established in 2008 by the Rattana Devi Gopal Dass Memorial Trust in Samba.

References

Educational institutions established in 2008
2008 establishments in Jammu and Kashmir
Samba district
Law schools in Jammu and Kashmir